Bramston Beach may refer to:

 Bramston Beach (politician) (1826–1901), long-serving British Member of Parliament
 Bramston Beach, Queensland, town in Australia